The OMAP (Open Multimedia Applications Platform) family, developed by Texas Instruments, was a series of image/video processors. They are proprietary system on chips (SoCs) for portable and mobile multimedia applications. OMAP devices generally include a general-purpose ARM architecture processor core plus one or more specialized co-processors. Earlier OMAP variants commonly featured a variant of the Texas Instruments TMS320 series digital signal processor.

The platform was created after December 12, 2002, as STMicroelectronics and Texas Instruments jointly announced an initiative for Open Mobile Application Processor Interfaces (OMAPI) intended to be used with 2.5 and 3G mobile phones, that were going to be produced during 2003. (This was later merged into a larger initiative and renamed the MIPI Alliance.) The OMAP was Texas Instruments' implementation of this standard. (The STMicroelectronics implementation was named Nomadik.)

OMAP did enjoy some success in the smartphone and tablet market until 2011 when it lost ground to Qualcomm Snapdragon.  On September 26, 2012, Texas Instruments announced they would wind down their operations in smartphone and tablet oriented chips and instead focus on embedded platforms. On November 14, 2012, Texas Instruments announced they would cut 1,700 jobs due to their shift from mobile to embedded platforms. The last OMAP5 chips were released in Q2 2013.

OMAP family 

The OMAP family consists of three product groups classified by performance and intended application:
 high-performance applications processors
 basic multimedia applications processors
 integrated modem and applications processors

Further, two main distribution channels exist, and not all parts are available in both channels.  The genesis of the OMAP product line is from partnership with cell phone vendors, and the main distribution channel involves sales directly to such wireless handset vendors.  Parts developed to suit evolving cell phone requirements are flexible and powerful enough to support sales through less specialized catalog channels; some OMAP 1 parts, and many OMAP 3 parts, have catalog versions with different sales and support models.  Parts that are obsolete from the perspective of handset vendors may still be needed to support products developed using catalog parts and distributor-based inventory management.

High-performance applications processors 
These are parts originally intended for use as application processors in smartphones, with processors powerful enough to run significant operating systems (such as Linux, FreeBSD, Android or Symbian), support connectivity to personal computers, and support various audio and video applications.

OMAP 1 
The OMAP 1 family started with a TI-enhanced ARM925 core (ARM925T), and then changed to a standard ARM926 core.  It included many variants, most easily distinguished according to manufacturing technology (130 nm except for the OMAP171x series), CPU, peripheral set, and distribution channel (direct to large handset vendors, or through catalog-based distributors).  In March 2009, the OMAP1710 family chips are still available to handset vendors.

Products using OMAP 1 processors include hundreds of cell phone models, and the Nokia 770 Internet tablets.
 OMAP1510 – 168 MHz ARM925T (TI-enhanced) + C55x DSP
 OMAP161x – 204 MHz ARM926EJ-S + C55x DSP, 130 nm technology
 OMAP162x – 204 MHz ARM926EJ-S + C55x DSP + 2 MB internal SRAM, 130 nm technology
 OMAP171x – 220 MHz ARM926EJ-S + C55x DSP, low-voltage 90 nm technology
 OMAP5910 – catalog availability version of OMAP 1510
 OMAP5912 – catalog availability version of OMAP1621 (or OMAP1611b in older versions)

OMAP 2 
These parts were only marketed to handset vendors. Products using these include both Internet tablets and mobile phones:
 OMAP2431 – 330 MHz ARM1136 + 220 MHz C64x DSP
 OMAP2430 – 330 MHz ARM1136 + 220 MHz C64x DSP + PowerVR MBX lite GPU, 90 nm technology
 OMAP2420 – 330 MHz ARM1136 + 220 MHz C55x DSP + PowerVR MBX GPU, 90 nm technology

OMAP 3 
The 3rd generation OMAP, the OMAP 3 is broken into 3 distinct groups: the OMAP34x, the OMAP35x, and the OMAP36x. OMAP34x and OMAP36x are distributed directly to large handset (such as cell phone) manufacturers.  OMAP35x is a variant of OMAP34x intended for catalog distribution channels.  The OMAP36x is a 45 nm version of the 65 nm OMAP34x with higher clock speed.

The OMAP 3611 found in devices like the Bookeen's Cybook Odyssey is a licensed crippled version of the OMAP 3621, both are the same silicon (as marking are the same) but officially the 3611 was sold to be only able to drive e-Ink screen and does not have access to IVA & DSP.

The video technology in the higher end OMAP 3 parts is derived in part from the DaVinci product line, which first packaged higher end C64x+ DSPs and image processing controllers with ARM9 processors last seen in the older OMAP 1 generation or ARM Cortex-A8.

Not highlighted in the list below is that each OMAP 3 SoC has an "Image, Video, Audio" (IVA2) accelerator.  These units do not all have the same capabilities. Most devices support 12 megapixel camera images, though some support 5 or 3 megapixels.  Some support HD imaging.

OMAP 4 

The 4th generation OMAPs, OMAP 4430 (used on Google Glass), 4460 (formerly named 4440), and 4470 all use a dual-core ARM Cortex-A9 CPU, with two ARM Cortex-M3 cores, as part of the "Ducati" sub-system, for off-loading low-level tasks. The 4430 and 4460 use a PowerVR SGX540 integrated 3D graphics accelerator, running at a clock frequency of 304 and 384 MHz respectively. 4470 has a PowerVR SGX544 GPU that supports DirectX 9 which enables it for use in Windows 8 as well as a dedicated 2D graphics core for increased power efficiency up to 50-90%. All OMAP 4 come with an IVA3 multimedia hardware accelerator with a programmable DSP that enables 1080p Full HD and multi-standard video encode/decode. OMAP 4 uses ARM Cortex-A9's with ARM's SIMD engine (Media Processing Engine, aka NEON) which may have a significant performance advantage in some cases over Nvidia Tegra 2's ARM Cortex-A9s with non-vector floating point units. It also uses a dual-channel LPDDR2 memory controller compared to Nvidia Tegra 2's single-channel memory controller.

OMAP 5 
The 5th generation OMAP, OMAP 5 SoC uses a dual-core ARM Cortex-A15 CPU with two additional Cortex-M4 cores to offload the A15s in less computationally intensive tasks to increase power efficiency, two PowerVR SGX544MP graphics cores and a dedicated TI 2D BitBlt graphics accelerator, a multi-pipe display sub-system and a signal processor. They respectively support 24 and 20 megapixel cameras for front and rear 3D HD video recording. The chip also supports up to 8 GB of dual channel LPDDR2/DDR3 memory, output to four HD 3D displays and 3D HDMI 1.4 video output. OMAP 5 also includes three USB 2.0 ports, one lowspeed USB 3.0 OTG port and a SATA 2.0 controller.

Basic multimedia applications processors 

These are marketed only to handset manufacturers. They are intended to be highly integrated, low cost chips for consumer products. The OMAP-DM series are intended to be used as digital media coprocessors for mobile devices with high megapixel digital still and video cameras. These OMAP-DM chips incorporate both an ARM processor and an Image Signal Processor (ISP) to accelerate processing of camera images.

 OMAP310 – ARM925T 
 OMAP331 – ARM926
 OMAP-DM270 – ARM7 + C54x DSP
 OMAP-DM299 – ARM7 + Image Signal Processor (ISP) + stacked mDDR SDRAM
 OMAP-DM500 – ARM7 + ISP + stacked mDDR SDRAM
 OMAP-DM510 – ARM926 + ISP + 128 MB stacked mDDR SDRAM
 OMAP-DM515 – ARM926 + ISP + 256 MB stacked mDDR SDRAM
 OMAP-DM525 – ARM926 + ISP + 256 MB stacked mDDR SDRAM

Integrated modem and applications processors 

These are marketed only to handset manufacturers.  Many of the newer versions are highly integrated for use in very low cost cell phones.
 OMAPV1035 – single-chip EDGE (was discontinued in 2009 as TI announced baseband chipset market withdrawal).
 OMAPV1030 – EDGE digital baseband
 OMAP850 – 200 MHz ARM926EJ-S + GSM/GPRS digital baseband + stacked EDGE co-processor
 OMAP750 – 200 MHz ARM926EJ-S + GSM/GPRS digital baseband + DDR Memory support
 OMAP733 – 200 MHz ARM926EJ-S + GSM/GPRS digital baseband + stacked SDRAM
 OMAP730 – 200 MHz ARM926EJ-S + GSM/GPRS digital baseband + SDRAM Memory support
 OMAP710 – 133 MHz ARM925 + GSM/GPRS digital baseband

OMAP L-1x 
The OMAP L-1x parts are marketed only through catalog channels, and have a different technological heritage than the other OMAP parts.  Rather than deriving directly from cell phone product lines, they grew from the video-oriented DaVinci product line by removing the video-specific features while using upgraded DaVinci peripherals.  A notable feature is use of a floating point DSP, instead of the more customary fixed point one.

The Hawkboard uses the OMAP-L138
 OMAP-L137 – 300 MHz ARM926EJ-S + C674x floating point DSP
 OMAP-L138 – 300 MHz ARM926EJ-S + C674x floating point DSP

Products using OMAP processors 
Many mobile phones released during early 21st century used OMAP SoCs, including the Nokia 3230, N9, N90, N91, N92, N95, N82, E61, E62, E63 and E90 mobile phones, as well as the Nokia 770, N800, N810 and N900 Internet tablets, Motorola Droid, Droid X, and Droid 2, and some early Samsung Galaxy devices, like Samsung Galaxy Tab 2 7.0 and Galaxy S II variant GT-I9100G. The Palm Pre, Pandora, Touch Book also use an OMAP SoC (the OMAP3430). Others to use an OMAP SoC include Sony Ericsson's Satio (Idou) and Vivaz, most Samsung phones running Symbian (including Omnia HD), the Nook Color, some Archos tablets (such as Archos 80 gen 9 and Archos 101 gen 9), Kindle Fire HD, Blackberry Playbook, Kobo Arc, and B&N Nook HD. Also, there are all-in-one smart displays using OMAP 4 SoCs, such as the Viewsonic VSD220 (OMAP 4430).
Motorola MOTOTRBO 2. generation radios use the OMAP-L132 or OMAP-L138 secure CPU.

OMAP SoCs are also used as the basis for a number of hobbyist, prototyping and evaluation boards, such as the BeagleBoard, PandaBoard, OMAP3 Board, Gumstix and Presonus digital mixing boards

Similar platforms 
 A31 by AllWinner
 Apple silicon by Apple
 ARMADA (SoC) 5xx/6xx/15xx by Marvell Technology Group
 Atom by Intel
 Exynos by Samsung
 i.MX by Freescale Semiconductor
 Jaguar and Puma by AMD
 K3Vx/Kirin by HiSilicon
 MTxxxx by MediaTek
 Nomadik by STMicroelectronics
 NovaThor by ST-Ericsson
 OCTEON by Cavium
 R-Car by Renesas
 RK3xxx by Rockchip
 Snapdragon, by Qualcomm, the only competing product which also features a DSP unit, the Qualcomm Hexagon
 Swift (SoC) by Philips
 Tegra by Nvidia
 TI Sitara ARM Processor SoC family
 VideoCore by Broadcom

See also 
Comparison of ARMv7-A cores - ARM
Comparison of ARMv8-A cores - ARM
 Distributed Codec Engine (libcde) a Texas Instruments API for the video codec engine in OMAP based embedded systems
 HiSilicon – by Huawei
 OpenMAX IL (Open Media Acceleration Integration Layer) a royalty-free cross-platform media abstraction API from the Khronos Group
 Tiva-C LaunchPad – an inexpensive self-contained, single-board microcontroller, about the size of a credit card but featuring an ARM Cortex M4 32-bit microcontroller at 80 MHz, with signal processing capabilities.

References

External links 
 Linux OMAP Mailing List Archive
 OMAP Application Processors
 OMAP3 Boards
 OMAP4 Boards
 OMAPpedia
 OMAPWorld

ARM-based systems on chips
Digital signal processors
Embedded microprocessors
System on a chip
Texas Instruments microprocessors